The canton of Aire-sur-la-Lys is a canton situated in the department of the Pas-de-Calais and in the Hauts-de-France region of northern France.

Composition
At the French canton reorganisation which came into effect in March 2015, the canton was expanded from 14 to 17 communes:

Aire-sur-la-Lys (Ariën)
Blessy
Estrée-Blanche (Strate)
Guarbecque (Gaverbeke)
Isbergues (Iberge)
Lambres
Liettres (Liste)
Ligny-lès-Aire
Linghem
Mazinghem
Quernes (Kernes)
Rely
Rombly
Roquetoire (Rokesdorn)
Saint-Hilaire-Cottes
Witternesse (Witernes)
Wittes (Witteke)

Population

See also 
Cantons of Pas-de-Calais 
Communes of Pas-de-Calais 
Arrondissements of the Pas-de-Calais department

References

Aire-sur-la-Lys